The Coupeville grain wharf is a wharf built in 1905 in Coupeville, Washington. It was formerly used for exporting grain produced on Whidbey Island. It is a contributing property to the Central Whidbey Island Historic District, registered on the National Register of Historic Places in 1973.

References

External links
 

Buildings and structures in Island County, Washington
Coupeville, Washington
1905 establishments in Washington (state)
Industrial buildings completed in 1905
National Register of Historic Places in Island County, Washington
Historic district contributing properties in Washington (state)
Transportation buildings and structures on the National Register of Historic Places in Washington (state)
Wharves on the National Register of Historic Places
Ebey's Landing National Historical Reserve